Minuscule 141 (in the Gregory-Aland numbering), δ 408 (Soden), is a Greek minuscule manuscript of the New Testament, on parchment leaves. Palaeographically it has been assigned to the 13th century. The manuscript has complex contents. It has marginalia.

Description 

The codex contains the entire of the New Testament (Gospels, Acts, Catholic, Pauline epistles, Revelation) on 400 parchment leaves (size ), they are split in two volumes. The text is written in one column per page, 26 lines per page. The leaves are arranged in quaternions, but separately numbered for each volume.

Text 
The Greek text of the codex is a representative of the Byzantine text-type. Hermann von Soden classified it to the textual family Kr. Aland placed it in Category V. According to the Claremont Profile Method it belongs to the textual family Kr in Luke 1 and 20. In Luke 10 no profile was made. It belongs to subgroup 35.

History 

It was examined and described by Birch (about 1782), Scholz, C. R. Gregory (in 1886), and Herman C. Hoskier, who collated its text only in the Apocalypse.

It is currently housed at the Vatican Library (Vat. gr. 1160), at Rome.

See also 

 List of New Testament minuscules
 Biblical manuscript
 Textual criticism

References

Further reading 

 Herman C. Hoskier, "Manuscripts of the Apocalypse – Recent Investigations V", BJRL vol. 8, pt 2 (1924), pp. 16–17.
 Herman C. Hoskier, "Concerning the Text of the Apocalypse" (London, 1929), pp. 104–107.

External links 

 Minuscule 141 at the Encyclopedia of Textual Criticism

Greek New Testament minuscules
13th-century biblical manuscripts
Manuscripts of the Vatican Library